The house at 209–211 S. Ninth Street was a historic home located at Terre Haute, Vigo County, Indiana. It was built about 1880, and was a one-story, Late Victorian rectangular frame duplex cottage. It featured an elaborate Eastlake movement style front porch with a shed roof. It has been demolished.

It was listed on the National Register of Historic Places in 1983, and was delisted in 2019.

The house no longer existed, or is no longer at its original location, in 2011.

References

Houses on the National Register of Historic Places in Indiana
Victorian architecture in Indiana
Houses completed in 1880
Buildings and structures in Terre Haute, Indiana
National Register of Historic Places in Terre Haute, Indiana
1880 establishments in Indiana
Former National Register of Historic Places in Indiana